Pablo Cuevas and Luis Horna were the defending champions, but lost in the third round to Igor Kunitsyn and Dmitry Tursunov.

Lukáš Dlouhý and Leander Paes won in the final 3–6, 6–3, 6–2 against Wesley Moodie and Dick Norman.

Seeds

Draw

Finals

Top half

Section 1

Section 2

Bottom half

Section 3

Section 4

External links
Draw
2009 French Open – Men's draws and results at the International Tennis Federation

Men's Doubles
French Open by year – Men's doubles
French Open